Kolbotn is an urban area in Norway's Nordre Follo county. Kolbotn is in the centre of the traditional district, Oppegård. The population is about 6,000. Kolbotn has several elementary schools, four middle schools and a high school. Town is located at the end of Kolbotnvannet, a lake.

Buildings include Stabburet, [the area's oldest building,] from the 18th century.

Sports
The football team Kolbotn IL hails from here. In 2006 Kolbotn women's team were top of the top league for women in Norway, the Toppserien.  The team included Norwegian national footballers Solveig Gulbrandsen, Trine Rønning, Christine Colombo Nilsen and Isabell Herlovsen.  Striker Rebecca Angus from Middlesbrough, England also played four seasons for Kolbotn in 2007-10.  Kolbotn won the 2007 Cup competition by beating Asker 4-2 on 10-11-07.  Kolbotn finished in third place in the Toppserien league for three seasons 2009-11 while coached by Dan Eggen. Kolbotn is also the first professional club of Ada Hegerberg, first women's Ballon d'Or in history (2018).

In popular culture
In the Norwegian legal drama  Aber Bergen, lead character Erik Aber is "a Kolbotn boy" and implies he is from a rough neighborhood compared to his refined middle class Bergen wife, Elea Wessel.

People from Kolbotn
 Tore Linné Eriksen (born 1945) an historian
 Jan Petersen (born 1946 in Oslo, but from Kolbotn), foreign minister
 Eivind Aarset (born 1961), jazz guitarist
 Lisa Aisato (born 1981) illustrator, author of picture books, visual artist
 Eivind Lønning (born 1983), jazz trumpeter
 Fenriz (born 1971), drummer, bass guitarist, guitarist
 Nocturno Culto (born 1972), singer, bass guitarist, guitarist

References

 
Villages in Akershus
Oppegård